Nova Scotia is the seventh-most populous province in Canada with 969,383 residents as of the 2021 Census of Population, and the second-smallest province in land area at .

Unlike the provinces of British Columbia, Ontario and Quebec, which have two-tiered municipal systems, Nova Scotia has a one-tier system of municipalities inclusive of four municipality types – regional municipalities, towns, county municipalities and district municipalities. Regional municipalities may incorporate under the Municipal Government Act (MGA) of 1998, which came into force on April 1, 1999, while towns, county municipalities and district municipalities are continued as municipalities under the MGA. The MGA gives municipal councils the power to make bylaws for "health, well being, safety and protection of persons" and "safety and protection of property" in addition to a few expressed powers.

Of its 49 municipalities, Nova Scotia has 4 regional municipalities, 25 towns, 9 county municipalities and 11 district municipalities.

Regional municipalities 
Regional municipalities are incorporated under the authority of section 372 of Nova Scotia's Municipal Government Act. To consider the incorporation of a regional municipality, the Nova Scotia Utility and Review Board (NSUARB) must receive a request from all municipalities within a county. If the request is unanimous, the NSUARB commissions the preparation of a study to determine if the incorporation of "a regional municipality would be in the interests of the people of the county." Nova Scotia's Governor in Council can order the incorporation of a regional municipality if the results of the study are deemed to be in the best interests of the people, and if a plebiscite is undertaken that results in the majority of electors in the county voting in favour of incorporation of a regional municipality.

Nova Scotia has four regional municipalities. The largest regional municipality by population is Halifax, which is the capital and largest municipality of Nova Scotia by population. Halifax's 439,819 residents represent  of the total population of the province. Cape Breton Regional Municipality is the second largest municipality with a population of 93,694 and a land area of  km2. The Region of Queens Municipality is Nova Scotia's smallest regional municipality by population with 10,422 residents and West Hants Regional Municipality is the smallest by land area  respectively. The province's newest regional municipality is West Hants Regional Municipality.

Rural municipalities 

A rural municipality in Nova Scotia provides local government for rural areas outside incorporated towns. Rural municipalities were established in 1879 and are inclusive of county municipalities and district municipalities. District municipalities are within historical counties that were previously subdivided into districts, whereas county municipalities are within historical counties that were not previously subdivided into districts.

County municipalities 

Nova Scotia's county municipalities originate from a historical system of 18 counties. Prior to the establishment of rural municipalities in 1879, local government was administered by appointed courts of sessions. On April 17, 1879, the original non-elected courts of sessions were abolished in favour of elected councils when The County Incorporation Act came into force. As a result, 12 county municipalities were established, while the remaining 6 counties, which were previously divided into districts for court sessional purposes, were established as district municipalities.

The province had 12 county municipalities for over a century until the mid-1990s when 3 became regional municipalities. Its 9 remaining county municipalities were then continued as county municipalities in 1998 under the authority of the Municipal Government Act. These county municipalities provide local government to the residents of their historical counties who live outside incorporated towns.

The Municipality of the County of Victoria is the least populated county municipality at a population of 6,750.

District municipalities 
Prior to the establishment of elected rural local government in Nova Scotia, 6 of the 18 historical counties were divided into districts for court sessional purposes. On April 17, 1879, these 6 historical counties were established as 12 district municipalities, rather than county municipalities, based on their previous district divisions. The district municipalities provide local government to the residents of the 6 historical counties who live outside incorporated towns. On April 1, 2020, the Municipality of the District of West Hants amalgamated with the Town of Windsor to become a regional municipality, reducing the number of district municipalities in Nova Scotia to 11. These continue administratively as district municipalities under the authority of the Municipal Government Act of 1998.

Nova Scotia's largest and smallest district municipalities by population are Lunenburg and St. Mary's with 25,545 and 2,161 residents respectively.

Towns 

Prior to mid-2015, towns were incorporated under the authority of sections 383 through 388 of Nova Scotia's Municipal Government Act (MGA). To incorporate an area as a town, 100 electors within the area were required to prepare and submit an application to the Nova Scotia Utility and Review Board (NSUARB). Upon receiving the application, the NSUARB would undertake a hearing to solicit input from interested parties and determine if there were reasonable grounds to incorporate as a town. The NSUARB would issue an incorporation order if the application was deemed reasonable.  On May 11, 2015, sections 383 through 388 of the MGA were repealed, thereby preventing further incorporations of towns.

Nova Scotia had 27 towns at the time of the 2016 census. This total has since been reduced to 25 due to the dissolution of the Town of Parrsboro and the amalgamation of the Town of Windsor with the Municipality of the District of West Hants. In the 2021 census, the remaining 25 towns had a cumulative population of 96,580. Nova Scotia's largest and smallest towns by population are Truro and Lockeport with 12,954 and 476 residents respectively.

List of municipalities

Former municipalities 

Nova Scotia has undergone reforms to local government since the mid-1990s, which has seen various municipalities amalgamate to form larger municipalities or dissolve into surrounding municipalities.

Amalgamations 
The Municipality of the County of Cape Breton, the City of Sydney, and the towns of Dominion, Glace Bay, Louisbourg, New Waterford, North Sydney, and Sydney Mines dissolved and amalgamated on April 1, 1995 to form the Cape Breton Regional Municipality. The City of Halifax along with the City of Dartmouth, the Town of Bedford and the Municipality of the County of Halifax also dissolved and amalgamated on April 1, 1996 to become the Halifax Regional Municipality. Also on April 1, 1996, the Municipality of the County of Queens amalgamated with the Town of Liverpool to form the Region of Queens Municipality. The latest amalgamation to occur involved the Town of Windsor and the Municipality of the District of West Hants merging to form the West Hants Regional Municipality on April 1, 2020.

Dissolutions 
Five towns have dissolved since 2011 and are now under the jurisdiction of their adjacent rural municipalities. Canso dissolved on July 1, 2012 to become part of the Municipality of the District of Guysborough. On April 1, 2015, Bridgetown and Springhill dissolved to become parts of the Municipality of the County of Annapolis and the Municipality of the County of Cumberland respectively. Hantsport became part of the Municipality of the District of West Hants on July 1, 2015. Parrsboro dissolved to become part of the Municipality of the County of Cumberland on November 1, 2016.

See also 

Demographics of Nova Scotia
Geography of Nova Scotia
List of census agglomerations in Atlantic Canada
List of communities in Nova Scotia
List of designated places in Nova Scotia
List of population centres in Nova Scotia
List of villages in Nova Scotia

Notes

References

External links 
Municipal – Provincial Relationships
Nova Scotia Department of Municipal Affairs
Union of Nova Scotia Municipalities

Municipalities